Lethe margaritae, the Bhutan treebrown, is a species of Satyrinae butterfly found in the  Indomalayan realm where it occurs in Bhutan and  Sikkim

References

margaritae